Gobustan State Historical and Cultural Reserve is located west of the settlement of Gobustan, about  southwest of the centre of Baku. It was established in 1966, when the area was declared a national historical landmark of Azerbaijan in an attempt to preserve the prehistoric rock carvings, mud volcanoes and musical stones in the region.

Gobustan State Reserve is very rich in archeological monuments. Gobustan Rock Art Cultural Landscape within the reserve, which covers an area of 537 ha, has more than 6,000 rock carvings, which depict people, animals, battle-pieces, ritual dances, bullfights, boats with armed oarsmen, warriors with lances in their hands, camel caravans, pictures of sun and stars, on the average dating back to 5,000-20,000 years.

Gobustan State Historical and Cultural Reserve acquired national status in 2006, and Gobustan Rock Art Cultural Landscape was inscribed on the UNESCO World Heritage List in 2007. As of 2011, the Petroglyph Museum functions in the reserve.

Prehistoric carvings
The rock carvings and petroglyphs, located at the part of the reserve called Gobustan Rock Art Cultural Landscape, display mesmerizing images of prehistoric life in the Caucasus. The well-preserved sketches display ancient populations travelling on reed boats; men hunting antelope and wild bulls, and women dancing.  The controversial Norwegian anthropologist Thor Heyerdahl returned many times to Azerbaijan between 1961 and his death in 2002 to study the site in his "Search for Odin".

The language of the ancient population of Gobustan is disputed, but the petroglyphs still give information about the lives of prehistoric people who lived there. More than 4,000 pictures of animals, humans, natural life experiences, hunting, and dancing were carved over a span of thousands of years. Most of the petroglyphs are on large cliffs, divided among multiple ancient residences, and in some cases they have been carved over older images. The first carvings depicted natural human and animal figures, often irregularly, but over time they began to more closely resemble the measurements and proportions of their subjects, including such details as the foot muscles of people in hunting scenes. The heads of the human figures tend to be small and carved without noses, mouths, eyes, or ears. However, experts do not interpret this lack of facial features as an indication that the Gobustan artists lacked technical skill, since some of the carvings demonstrate a higher degree of complexity and detail. Many scenes from tribal life are depicted among the petroglyphs, and images from the Seven Beauties cave suggest that women may have participated in hunting.

Roman inscription 

In June 1948, the chief of the archaeological expedition of the Institute of History of the Academy of Sciences of the Azerbaijan SSR Ishag Jafarzadeh discovered a Latin inscription on a large rock near the southeastern slope of the Boyuk-Dash mountain, which reads:

Because of its uniqueness and mysteriousness, the inscription attracted attention of specialists in Latin epigraphy and history of ancient Rome and Transcaucasia. It is the easternmost of all known Latin inscriptions, and is the only Latin inscription found on the territory of ancient Caucasian Albania. Most experts consider this inscription to be an indisputable proof of the presence of Roman troops in the eastern part of Transcaucasia in late 1st century BC. An alternative theory suggests that the inscription might have been left by a Roman centurion who carried out a secret intelligence or diplomatic mission.

Gaval Dash
The Gaval Dash is a natural musical stone which can only be found in Gobustan, Azerbaijan. It stands at the entrance to the reserve, and is one of four "singing stones" found there. When this big, two-meter-long stone is struck with smaller rocks, it makes a hollow, ringing sound, resembling the sound of a tambourine, or "gaval" in Azerbaijani language. This unique resonance is created by microscopic holes inside the rock, which are believed to result from the dry climate and the effect of natural gas in the region.

Mud volcanoes
It's estimated that 300 of the planet's estimated 700 mud volcanoes are located in Gobustan, Azerbaijan, and the Caspian Sea. Mud volcanoes of Gobustan are a popular attraction for both scientists and tourists, the latter often bathing in mud, which is thought to have medicinal qualities. 

In April 2021, a groundbreaking ceremony was held for the new Mud Volcanoes Tourism Complex, which will cover the area of 12-hectares, and include a quad bike path, footpaths, a zip line and an observation tower, a parking lot, a souvenir shop, as well as therapeutic baths. There are also plans to improve road infrastructure by extending a 20-kilometer road from the Gobustan Reserve to “Gilinj” mud volcano site and nearby volcanoes and create the Baku-Gobustan-Mud volcanoes tourism cluster.

Flora and fauna 
The natural conditions were completely different 20-25 thousand years ago. Judging by the depictions of animals and human figures in Gobustan, the region had a warm climate 10 to 12 thousand years ago. People were wearing light clothes, and women were wearing short leather dresses. Because of the permanent hot weather, greenery and abundant water, Gobustan was the habitat of wild animals such as bulls, horses, deer, goats, and others. According to the rock carvings and the archeological evidence, wolves, tigers, foxes, jackals and other wild animals also inhabited this area. 

In 1968, bones of an unknown large animal were discovered  under the ground during the excavation works near Atbulakh. The workers informed the Ministry of Culture of Azerbaijan SSR. After the examination of the discovered bones, it was determined that these bones were the cervical vertebrae of the southern mammoth that lived in Gobustan.

External links
Official website
Gobustan from "Window to Baku"
The Rock Engravings of Gobustan from a site devoted to Jean Auel's books.

See also
 Nature of Azerbaijan
 National Parks of Azerbaijan
 State Reserves of Azerbaijan
 State Game Reserves of Azerbaijan
 Zoroastrianism in Azerbaijan
 Gobustan District
 Ramana, Azerbaijan
 Khinalyg
 Yanar Dag
 Fire Temple of Baku

References 

State reserves of Azerbaijan
Environment of Azerbaijan
World Heritage Sites in Azerbaijan
Mud volcanoes
1966 establishments in Azerbaijan